École de Football Yéo Martial, also known as EFYM, is an Ivorian football team in Abidjan, Ivory Coast. They were promoted to the highest level of football in Ivory Coast, and play their games at 4,000 capacity Parc des Sports de Treichville.

External links 
Official Website

Football clubs in Ivory Coast
Football clubs in Abidjan
Association football clubs established in 1997
1997 establishments in Ivory Coast
Military association football clubs